Saxe-Weimar-Eisenach was a state of the German Empire, created as a duchy in 1809 by the merger of the Ernestine duchies of Saxe-Weimar and Saxe-Eisenach, which had been in personal union since 1741. It was raised to a grand duchy in 1815 by resolution of the Vienna Congress. In 1903, it officially changed its name to the Grand Duchy of Saxony, but this name was rarely used. The Grand Duchy came to an end in the German Revolution of 1918–19 with the other monarchies of the German Empire. It was succeeded by the Free State of Saxe-Weimar-Eisenach, which was merged into the new Free State of Thuringia two years later.

The full grand ducal style was Grand Duke of Saxe-Weimar-Eisenach, Landgrave in Thuringia, Margrave of Meissen, Princely Count of Henneberg, Lord of Blankenhayn, Neustadt and Tautenburg.

The Saxe-Weimar-Eisenach branch has been the most genealogically senior extant branch of the House of Wettin since 1672.

Geography 
The Grand Duchy of Saxe-Weimar-Eisenach consisted of three greater areas, each of which formed a  administratively, plus several exclaves.  Neighboring countries were Prussia, Saxony, Bavaria, Hesse-Kassel (until 1866, when it was incorporated in the Prussian province of Hesse-Nassau), and all the other Thuringian states (Saxe-Altenburg, Saxe-Coburg-Gotha, Saxe-Meiningen, Reuss Elder Line, Reuss Junior Line, Schwarzburg-Rudolstadt and Schwarzburg-Sondershausen).

The northern part of the Weimar district was flat and part of the Thuringian Basin; the southern and eastern parts were situated on the Ilm-Saale Plateau and in the Saale valley.  The northern part of Eisenach district was hilly (Hörselberge and Hainich hills); the central part with the town of Eisenach was in the Hörsel valley; further south were the mountains of the Thuringian Forest, followed by the Werra valley, the Kupenrhön mountains and finally, in the far south, the main chain of the Rhön mountains.  The district Neustadt was located in hills with altitudes between 200 and 400 meters.

The main rivers in the country were: 
 the Saale flowing through Jena in the east
 the Werra in Vacha and Eisenach, and its tributaries the Felda and Ulster in the west
 the Unstrut in the exclaves Allstedt and Oldisleben in the north
 the White Elster in Berga in the far east
 the Ilm, flowing through Ilmenau, Apolda and the capital Weimar in the centre. Acting Prime Minister Goethe once described Weimar as "Athens on the Ilm".

The highest elevation in the grand duchy were the Kickelhahn near Ilmenau, the Ellenbogen in the Rhön and the Ettersberg near Weimar.

In 1895, the Grand Duchy of Saxe-Weimar-Eisenach was administratively divided into three districts :

Furthermore, the districts of Weimar and Eisenach were each subdivided into two .  In the case of Weimar, these were: Weimar and Apolda, in the case of Eisenach they were the Eisenach and Dermbach.  In all, there were 31 cities and 594 municipalities in the Grand Duchy.  The Grand Dukes of Saxe-Weimar-Eisenach granted "city" status to three localities in the state, namely Berka/Werra (Eisenach district, 1847), Ruhla (Eisenach district, 1886, administered jointly with the Duke of Saxe-Gotha) and Münchenbernsdorf (Neustadt district, 1904).

In 1840, there were 13 cities with over 2,000 inhabitants.  In the 70 years to 1910, the Grand Duchy industrialized heavily and the population of the largest cities grew, while the medium-sized cities remained constant or even lost population.  The population of Stadtlengsfeld shrank dramatically after the Jewish emancipation, when most of the city's Jewish citizens migrated to larger cities.

In 1910, several other towns had grown past the 2,000 inhabitants mark: Ruhla (Weimar part: 3917 v. 1533: +156%), Blankenhain (3405 v. 1689: +102%), Bad Sulza, (3052 v. 1422: +115%), Auma (2978 v. 1701, +75%), Triptis (2948 v. 1480: +99%), Tiefenort (2539 v. 1237: +105%), Bad Berka (2379 v. 1228: +94%), Oberweimar (2095 v. 621: +237%), Oldisleben (2064 v. 1332: +55) and Mihla (2008 v. 1294: +55%).

History 

The duchies of Saxe-Weimar and Saxe-Eisenach had been ruled in personal union by the same branch of the House of Wettin since 1741, after the Eisenach line had died out upon the death of Duke Wilhelm Heinrich. The first Duke of the personal union was Ernest Augustus I, who built the Belvedere Palace in Weimar. His son Ernest Augustus II reigned for only three years, and died at the age of 20 years.  At the age of 18, he married the Brunswick Princess Anna Amalia, one year his junior and a niece of King Frederick the Great of Prussia. A year later she gave birth to her son, Charles Augustus and after another year, when she was already a widow, to her son Constantine.

As Dowager Duchess Anna Amalia actively took up the regency, with the approval of the Empress Maria Theresa and the support of her ethical Minister Baron von Fritsch. As educator for her sons, she employed the poet Christoph Martin Wieland, who was a professor at the university of Erfurt.

At 18 years of age, Charles Augustus married Princess Louise of Hesse-Darmstadt. He employed the poet Johann Wolfgang von Goethe, with whom he soon became friends.  Goethe, in turn, invited the authors Johann Gottfried Herder and Friedrich Schiller to Weimar, thus laying the foundation for the Weimar Classicism circle, which was supported in the background by Anna Amalia. Later regents would see it as main task to guard this heritage.

In 1804 Duke Charles Augustus' eldest son and heir Charles Frederick married Maria Pavlovna Romanova, sister of Emperor Alexander I of Russia, a conjugal union which decisively promoted the rise of the Ernestine Saxe-Weimar dynasty. It also gave the duchy some protection during the turmoil of the Napoleonic Wars. Though at first an ally of Prussia in the Napoleonic War of the Fourth Coalition, Duke Charles Augustus escaped his deposition by joining the Confederation of the Rhine on 15 December 1806.

After the official merger in 1809, the Duchy of Saxe-Weimar-Eisenach consisted of the separate districts around the capital Weimar in the north and Eisenach in the west. Thanks to their Russian connection, the duchy gained substantially from the Congress of Vienna in 1815. It also received most of the Principality of Erfurt, which had been an exclave of Mainz before the war and a directly administered French fief under occupation. It further gained smaller possessions, such as Blankenhain and Kranichfeld. Finally, the country was raised to a Grand Duchy.

The cosmopolitan Grand Duke gave his grand duchy the first liberal constitution in Germany, on 5 May 1816. Many liberal-minded people participated and the speakers, most of them students, must be regarded as having been among the earliest democrats in Germany.

Maria Pavlovna, who was Grand Duchess from 1828, featuring composers like Franz Liszt and Peter Cornelius. Her art-loving son Charles Alexander (1818–1901), who was Grand Duke from 1853, also supported the arts, and music in particular. He was married to Sophie, who supported his plans, and he rebuilt the decaying Wartburg the romantic historicism style of the day and had it painted by Moritz von Schwind. He also supported, albeit half-heartedly, the founding of the School of Applied Arts in Weimar, which merged to form the Bauhaus in 1919.

In 1901 Charles Alexander was succeeded by his grandson William Ernest, who was married to Caroline Reuss of Greiz and later to Feodora of Saxe-Meiningen. In 1903, the Grand Duchy officially changed its name to Grand Duchy of Saxony. However, many people continued to call it Saxe-Weimar-Eisenach, to avoid confusion with the neighbouring Kingdom of Saxony.

William Ernest abdicated the throne on 9 November 1918, thereby ending the monarchy in the state. It continued as the Free State of Saxe-Weimar-Eisenach, until 1920, when it merged with most of its neighbours to form Thuringia, with Weimar as the state capital.

Religion 
In the Grand Duchy of Saxe-Weimar-Eisenach, as in all the Thuringian states, the Lutheran faith was the most prevalent.  Specifically, in 1895, the reported religious affiliations of the 339,217 were: 
 Evangelical: 325,315 (95.9%)
 Catholic: 12,112 (3.6%)
 Jewish: 1,290 (0.4%)
 Other / Non-denominational: 500 (0.1%)

In the district of Eisenach, the distribution was slightly different.  Of the 95,226 inhabitants were: 
 Evangelical: 85,319 (89.6%)
 Catholic: 8,809 (9.3%)
 Jewish: 979 (1.0%)
 Other / Non-denominational: 119 (0.1%)

The Catholic and Jewish minorities in the district Eisenach lived mainly in the Rhön.  The area around the town of Geisa was predominantly Catholic and belonged to the Diocese of Fulda.

Constitution and administration 
Under the Constitution of 5 May 1816 (revised 15 October 1850), Saxe-Weimar-Eisenach was a constitutional monarchy, hereditary in the male line.  Under the Electoral Act of 1852, the Landtag had 31 members, of whom 21 were elected in general elections.  One member was elected by the landed former Imperial Knights, four were elected by other wealthy landowners, and five by voters who had an annual income exceeding 1000 Thaler from other sources.  The latter group of voters were popularly called "thousand taler men".  The Electoral Act of 17 April 1896 enlarged the parliament to 33 members.  The Grand Duchy had one vote in the Bundesrat and three members in the Reichstag.

In 1909, general suffrage was introduced, under the auspices of Alfred Appelius, the later Speaker of the Landtag.  The large landowners and the "thousand taler men" retained their extra votes, and five new special members were added to the parliament, representing the University of Jena, the Chamber of Commerce, the Chamber of Trade, the Chamber of Agriculture and the Chamber of Labour

The highest court in the land was the Court of Appeals in Jena, which dealt with appeals from all Thuringian states.  There were Regional Courts in Weimar and Eisenach.

The Grand Duchy had one infantry regiment, which was part of the Prussian 11th Army Corps.

Rulers of Saxe-Weimar-Eisenach

Dukes of Saxe-Weimar and Saxe-Eisenach, 1741–1809 
 Ernest Augustus I, 1741–1748; Duke of Saxe-Weimar since 1707
 Ernest Augustus II, 1748–1758
 Charles Augustus, 1758–1809, until 1775 under the regency of his mother Duchess Anna Amalia of Brunswick-Wolfenbüttel

Dukes of Saxe-Weimar-Eisenach, 1809–1815 
 Charles Augustus, 1809–1815; Duke of Saxe-Weimar and Saxe-Eisenach since 1758

Grand Dukes of Saxe-Weimar-Eisenach, 1815–1918 
 Charles Augustus, 1815–1828
 Charles Frederick, 1828–1853
 Charles Alexander, 1853–1901
 William Ernest, 1901–1918

Heads of the House of Saxe-Weimar-Eisenach, 1918–present 
 Grand Duke Wilhelm Ernst, 1918–1923
 Hereditary Grand Duke Carl August, 1923–1988
 Prince Michael, 1988–present

Economy

Agriculture 
In 1895, 37.9% of the workforce were employed in the agriculture and forestry industries, 38.9% worked in the manufacturing sector, and 16.4% were employed in the service sector.

Until 1900, agriculture was the most important branch in the economy of the Grand Duchy. A total of 56% of the duchy's territory was used for agriculture, mainly in the districts Weimar and Neustadt and the exclaves Allstedt and Oldisleben in the Goldene Aue area.

The harvest of 1895 consisted of: 

Fruit was mainly grown in the Saale valley, around Jena and Bürgel. There was some viticulture north of Jena, between Dornburg and Camburg.

Stock breeding was also widespread. In 1892, there were 19,121 horses in the Grand Duchy, 119,720 cattle, 113,208 sheep, 122,974 pigs, 46,405 goats and 16,999 beehives.

Game was only found near Eisenach, in Eichenzell and in the Ilmenau exclave, where the grand duke's largest hunting ground was located on the banks of the Gabelbach. About 50% of the forests were state-owned. The dominant tree species were beech (in the Weimar district), pine (especially in the Neustadt district) and spruce (in the Eisenach district and around Ilmenau). The Grand Duchy's State Forestry Office was based in Eisenach.

Manufacturing Industries 
A versatile array of manufacturing industries developed in the Grand Duchy. For example, in Bürgel and Ilmenau, there were porcelain factories (in all, there were 39 such factories in the country).

In Ilmenau and Jena, glass was made (in particular, in the Schott factories). The glass industry was specialized in industrial glass (for example measuring devices such as thermometers in the area around Ilmenau) and optical products, around Jena. In 1846, Carl Zeiss found a precision engineering and optical company that quickly developed into a world leader. In 1917, the company had  employees. In 1889, Ernst Abbe founded the Carl-Zeiss-Stiftung, which became the sole share holder of the companies Carl Zeiss AG and Schott AG.

The textile industry was also important. It was concentrated in Apolda (mostly hosiery knitting mills) and Neustadt an der Orla. Other major textile plants could be found in Wenigenjena, Eisenach, Weida, Remda and Blankenhain. In 1895, the textile industry employed approximately  people.

Ruhla was a center of the metalworking industry. The country's first car plant was built in 1895 in Eisenach. Chemical industries, such as a paint factory, could also be found in Eisenach. Furthermore, there were a paper mill in Oberweimar and a toy factory in Ilmenau. Wicker-work was manufactured in the Kuppenrhön area and pipes were made in Geisa. In 1895, there were 257 breweries in the Grand Duchy; the largest of these were in Apolda and Ilmenau.

Mining industry 
Ilmenau and Ruhla were important mining centers in the Thuringian Forest. Around 1900, potash industry began to develop in the Werra valley, around Vacha and Berka/Werra. There were salt works in Creuzburg and Bad Sulza.

Trade 
The major transport centers were Weimar and Eisenach. Many banks opened branch offices here. In 1895, there were 23 branch offices of savings banks in the Grand Duchy, and they were managing deposits totalling approximately 40 million Reichsmark.

The Grand Duchy was part of the Thuringian Toll Union, except for the exclaves Ostheim, Oldisleben, and Allstedt.

Education 
There was one state university in the Grand Duchy, the University of Jena, which was funded by Saxe-Weimar-Eisenach together with the other Thuringian states. There were several art and music schools in Weimar, and in Ilmenau, there was the Technische Universität Ilmenau, a privately owned university providing technical and scientific education. Gymnasiums existed in Weimar, Eisenach and Jena; Realschules were found in Weimar, Apolda, Jena, Eisenach, Neustadt and Ilmenau.  In 1895, there were 462 primary schools, and any child would receive at least four years of primary education. Large libraries of  volumes each were maintained in Weimar and Jena. In 1869, a State Museum was founded in Weimar.

See also 
 Ernestine duchies
 Thuringian states

Notes

References 
 Carl Ferdinand Weiland: General Charte von dem Großherzogthume Weimar-Eisenach nach den besten vorhandenen Hülfsmitteln entworfen und gezeichnet von C. F. Weiland, Geographical Institute of Weimar, 1817, reprinted: Rockstuhl, Bad Langensalza 2009, 
 Karl Helmrich: Geschichte des Großherzogthums Sachsen-Weimar-Eisenach für Schule und Haus, Albrecht, Weimar, 1852,

External links 

 
 
 
 

States and territories established in 1809
States of the Confederation of the Rhine
States of the German Confederation
States of the North German Confederation
States of the German Empire
States of the Weimar Republic
Weimar-Eisenach
 
 
House of Wettin
 
Weimar
Eisenach
Saxe-Weimar-Eisenach
 
1809 establishments in Germany
1918 disestablishments in Germany